Speratus was a Roman cognomen (surname), and may refer to:

 Speratus (??-180), principal spokesman of the Scillitan Martyrs
 Speratus, bishop of an English see and recipient of a letter from Alcuin of York of 797, possibly Unwona (bishop of Leicester).
 Paul Speratus (1484-1581), preacher and hymn writer during the Reformation.